Meyer Abovitz (מאיר בן ישעיהו אבוביץ; alternate spelling Meir Abowitz; born 1876 - died 1941) was a Rabbi and Rosh Yeshiva active in Mizrachi in Eastern Europe between the Two World Wars.

Biography
He studied in Slabodka, Kovno and Radin, and received Semicha (ordination) from Rabbis Moshe Danishevsky, Hirsh Rabinovich, and Malkiel Tannenbaum, respectively holding the positions of Av Beit Din  in Slabodka, Kovno and Lomza. He was married to Chana née Malach; their daughter Feige Rachel ("Fanny") was married to Rabbi Simcha Wasserman.

Rabbi Abovitz was Av Beit Din and Rav in Telatycze, White Russia and then Lubiezh (Lubcza, modern Lubcha). The latter was destroyed during the early days of the First World War, and he then relocated to German held Navahrudak, where he headed the Bet Yosef Yeshiva; see Novardok Yeshiva. The Rav there was Meyer Meyerovitz.

Rabbi Abovitz participated in the founding assembly of Mizrachi of Lithuania and Poland, in Vilna, 1919; he was involved in various committees of the movement in Poland between the two World Wars. See Mizrachi in Poland.   He was also active in "religious national education" which he saw a counterweight to the Jewish secular schools founded in Navahrudak following the First World War. Despite his involvement with Mizrachi he was also accepted by the Agudath Yisrael.

Navahrudak was occupied by Nazi Germany in July 1941, and Rabbi Abovitz was martyred with the rest of the Jewish population; see .

Works
He authored the following works:
Zichron Yeshayahu - derushim
Kochvei Ohr - explanations of the Aggadah
Pnei Meir - on the Jerusalem Talmud
Pnei Meir - on the Weekly Torah portion

References

External links and references
 אנציקלופדיה של הציונות הדתית, א, עמ 2–1; ספר הציונות הדתית, ב, עמ 499

1876 births
1941 deaths
Belarusian Orthodox rabbis
Rosh yeshivas
20th-century Russian rabbis
Soviet rabbis